Kawamura Takeji (川村 竹治, 1 September 1871 – 8 September 1955) was a Japanese businessman and the 12th Governor-General of Taiwan (1928–1929), Minister of Justice (1932). He was governor of Wakayama Prefecture (1911–1914), Kagawa Prefecture (1914–1915) and Aomori Prefecture (1917–1918).

References

 

1871 births
1955 deaths
Japanese businesspeople
Governors of Aomori Prefecture
Governors of Kagawa Prefecture
Governors of Wakayama Prefecture
Government ministers of Japan
Governors-General of Taiwan